Lesueuria is a genus of ctenophores belonging to the family Bolinopsidae.

Species:

Lesueuria hyboptera 
Lesueuria pinnata 
Lesueuria tiedemanni 
Lesueuria vitrea

References

Ctenophores